Rebecca Cox may refer to:
 Rebecca Gernhardt Cox, former White House staff member and airline executive
 Rebecca Cox Jackson (1795–1871), African-American free woman, writer, and religious activist
 Rebecca Brandewyne (born 1955), author; full name Mary Rebecca Wadsworth Brandewyne Cox